The Lancashire and Yorkshire Railway Class 27 is a class of 0-6-0 steam locomotive designed for freight work on the Lancashire and Yorkshire Railway (L&YR).

Construction and operation

Class 27 locomotives were designed by John Aspinall and 484 were built between 1889 - 1918 at Horwich Works. It was the standard goods engine used by the Lancashire & Yorkshire Railway. Aspinall opted for a two-cylinder format with a non superheated round top boiler. David Joy's configuration of valve gear was employed. By the time Aspinall became general manager of the L&YR on 1 July 1899 more than 400 of the simple but powerful engines had been built. More were built under his successors, Henry Hoy and George Hughes, albeit with some modifications. By 1918 there were the 484 locomotives in the class.

Superheating

Under Hughes, one of the class was subject to early experiments in superheating, the process of increasing the temperature of steam produced in the boiler so the minimum of energy was lost. After months of trials, 20 superheated engines were authorised to be built and the first of the superheated class 27s emerged from Horwich Works in 1909. The superheated 27s had the same boiler pressure as the originals, 180 psi. The first batch had round topped boilers, but in 1912 a second batch of 20 was constructed with Belpaire fireboxes.

Although the class was augmented by 60 engines between 1900 and 1909 and another ten between 1917–18, the last five built reverted to the original 1889 specification.

Ownership changes
It is a tribute to the soundness, usefulness and simple practicality of Aspinall's design that 300 of the class passed into the ownership of the London, Midland and Scottish Railway (LMS) and around 50 were operating in British Railways (BR) service in summer 1960. British Railways took ownership of 235 of the class in 1948 and renumbered them 52088-52529 (with gaps) by the addition of 40000 to their LMS numbers.

32 locomotives were loaned to the Railway Operation Division during World War I, all of them were eventually returned once the war had ended.

Preservation
One locomotive, 1895-built L&YR number 1300 (later LMS 12322 and BR 52322) has survived and is preserved at the East Lancashire Railway. It is owned by Andy Booth and its most recent overhaul was completed in 2021.

The rebuild 
The rebuild of the Class 27 was the L&YR Class 28, designed by George Hughes.

References

Herring, Peter (2000) Classic British Steam Locomotives, Enderby: Abbeydale, p. 192, 
Hall, Peter & Fox, Peter (2002) Preserved Locomotives of British Railways, Platform 5: Sheffield,

External links

 Class LYR27 Details at Rail UK

27
0-6-0 locomotives
Railway locomotives introduced in 1889
Standard gauge steam locomotives of Great Britain
Railway Operating Division locomotives
Freight locomotives